True Crime is a series of open world action-adventure video games told from the perspective of law enforcement. There are two games in the series, True Crime: Streets of LA, released in 2003, and True Crime: New York City, released in 2005. Each game features GPS-accurate open world recreations of parts of Los Angeles and New York City, respectively. Streets of LA was developed by Luxoflux for the PlayStation 2, Xbox and GameCube, and ported to Microsoft Windows by LTI Gray Matter, to mobile by MFORMA and to macOS by Aspyr. It was published on all systems by Activision, except the Mac version, which was published by Aspyr. New York City was developed by Luxoflux for PlayStation 2, Xbox and GameCube, and ported to Windows by Aspyr and to mobile by Hands-On Mobile. It was published on all systems by Activision.

Streets of LA received generally mixed-to-positive reviews, with many reviewers favourably comparing it to Grand Theft Auto III and Grand Theft Auto: Vice City. It was also a commercial success, selling over three million units worldwide across all systems. New York City received mixed-to-negative reviews, with many critics feeling the game had been rushed to release incomplete. It was also a commercial failure, selling only 72,000 units across North America in its first two weeks of release.

Originally, New York City was intended as the first of a two-part series set in New York, but after the game's poor critical and commercial performance, Activision scrapped the direct sequel and put plans for future True Crime games on hold. In 2007, they hired United Front Games to develop an open world game set in Hong Kong. By 2009, this game had become True Crime: Hong Kong. However, in 2011, the game was cancelled. Square Enix employee, and avid fan of the franchise, Heath Hallas made strives to revive the game, until, ultimately, the publishing rights were picked up by Square Enix several months later, and True Crime: Hong Kong was ultimately released in 2012 as Sleeping Dogs, which has no connection to the True Crime series. In 2014, Activision abandoned the True Crime trademark.

Games
 True Crime: Streets of LA was developed by Luxoflux for the PlayStation 2, Xbox and GameCube, by LTI Gray Matter for Microsoft Windows, by MFORMA for mobile, and by Aspyr for macOS. It was published on all systems by Activision, except the macOS version, which was published by Aspyr. The PlayStation 2, Xbox and GameCube versions were released  in 2003 in North America on November 4, and in Europe on November 7. The PC version was released in North America on May 14 and in Europe on May 28, 2004. The mobile version was released in North America on November 21, 2004, while the macOS version was released in North America on March 1, 2005.
 True Crime: New York City was developed by Luxoflux for the PlayStation 2, Xbox and GameCube, by Aspyr for Microsoft Windows, and by Hands-On Mobile for mobile. It was published for all systems by Activision. The PlayStation 2, Xbox and GameCube versions were released in 2005 in North America on November 16 and in Europe on November 25, 2005. The PC version was released in North America on March 24, 2006, and in Europe on March 30. The mobile version was released in North America on March 21, 2007.

Gameplay
The gameplay in the True Crime games is broadly similar. Both are open world action-adventure games played from a third-person perspective. In Streets of LA, players control Detective Nicholas Kang of the fictional Elite Operations Division (E.O.D.), a hand-picked autonomous unit of the regular LAPD. In New York City, players control Detective Marcus Reed of the PDNY (a fictional version of the NYPD).

Streets of LA was one of the first non-Grand Theft Auto open world action-adventure games released after Grand Theft Auto III in 2001, and, as such, was labeled by many as a Grand Theft Auto clone, as the core game mechanics are identical to Grand Theft Auto III, and its 2002 successor, Grand Theft Auto: Vice City – in both Streets of LA and New York City, the player can travel across the city freely, commandeer vehicles, do whatever they want in terms of attacking and/or killing innocent civilians, and progress through the storyline at their own leisure, spending as much time traversing the city as they wish. However, the major difference from Grand Theft Auto games is that in the True Crime games, the player controls a law enforcement officer.

Compared to Streets of LA, New York City introduced more variety into the open world gameplay, with the player able to engage in minigames and sidequests, such as a street racing circuit, an underground fight club tournament, and securing CIs. Also new to New York City is that many buildings throughout the city, beyond those related to the game's story, are accessible to the player. These include pharmacies, where the player can purchase medicine, and delis, where they can purchase food (both of which restore lost health), clothing stores where they can purchase new outfits, car dealers where they can purchase new cars, dojos where they can purchase new fighting techniques, record stores where they can purchase new songs for the game's soundtrack, gun stores where they can purchase new weaponry and ammunition, and other random buildings such as hotels, nightclubs, restaurants, and apartment buildings. In most business interiors, players can extort the owner for extra cash and/or plant evidence to make an arrest.

In both games, during shooting missions, the game auto-targets the closest opponent. If the player wishes to switch target to another opponent, they must do so manually. When the player is in shooting mode, they can enter "Precision Targeting" at any time. At this point, the game switches to first-person, zooms in on the target, and goes into slow motion momentarily. While in Precision Targeting, if the targeting reticule turns green (Streets of LA) or blue (New York City), the player can hit the enemy with a neutralizing, non-lethal shot. If the player fires when the reticule is red, the enemy will be killed instantly. Players can also take cover during shootouts, firing from behind cover when the opportunity presents itself. Players are also free to pick up any weapons dropped by enemies. Once the ammo of these weapons is depleted, however, the player character will drop the weapon and revert to his standard issue handgun, which, although it does need to be reloaded, never runs out of ammo.

In hand-to-hand combat in Streets of LA, the player has four main attacks; high kick, low kick, punch, and grapple. After hitting an enemy a certain number of times, the enemy will be stunned, at which point the player can perform a combo by pressing a series of buttons. In hand-to-hand combat in New York City, the player has three main attacks; light attack, heavy attack, and grapple. When the player grapples an opponent, they are free to throw them, or hit them with a number of light and/or heavy attacks. At certain points during combat, the enemy will be stunned, and a meter will appear on-screen prompting the player to press either the heavy attack or light attack button as much as possible within a set time. The more times the player presses the button, the more devastating the resulting special attack. The player can also toggle between different fighting styles, and switch to using a melee weapon at any time.

Driving missions can involve either trying to catch another car, escape from another car, or tailing another car. At all times, when the player is in a car, their car's condition is shown on screen. If the car's health meter empties, the car is close to destruction. During normal driving missions in both games, the player can solve random crimes given by the radio dispatcher.

In New York City, the map is divided up into twenty different neighborhoods. When Reed solves a random crime in a particular area, the crime rate in that area drops. After he has solved a set number of crimes in one area, that area is considered "clean", and crime rates will not increase (although random crimes will still occur within the area). If Reed continues to ignore random crimes in a given area before it is clean, the crime rate in that area will increase, leading to stores closing, dirtier streets, boarded up buildings, more aggressive civilians, and more random crimes needed to clean the area up.

Upgrades are handled differently in each game. In Streets of LA, the player can access 24/7 facilities throughout the map to upgrade their driving, fighting or shooting abilities. 24/7 facilities are only accessible if the player has an available "badge". Badges are earned by acquiring "Reward points"; every one-hundred reward points is converted into one badge. Entry into a 24/7 facility costs one badge, and the player must complete a challenge to earn the upgrade. The player earns reward points for arresting or killing criminals, solving crimes and completing missions. Points are deducted for killing civilians and failing missions. Upgrades in New York City simply cost money, with no points system and no challenge to complete. Upgrades become available for purchase as the player moves up through five grades of promotion. Money in the game can be earned legitimately by collecting wages, or illegitimately by selling evidence at pawn shops and/or extorting business owners.

Both game also feature a "Good Cop/Bad Cop" system. If the player arrests criminals, solves crimes, and shoots opponents with neutralizing shots, they will get Good Cop points. If, however, they kill civilians, shoot criminals in the head, fail to identify themselves as a police officer before opening fire, extort businesses, or sell evidence to pawn stores, they will get Bad Cop points. In Streets of LA, if the player's Bad Cop score gets too high, civilians will begin to attack Kang. If the Bad Cop score reaches 99, SWAT will attempt to kill him. In New York City, if the player's Bad Cop score gets too high, the player is considered to have "gone rogue", and other police officers will begin to attack Reed.

Development

Streets of LA

Streets of LA was first announced on May 15, 2002, when Activision revealed Luxoflux were developing an "original action-racing game inspired by Hong Kong action films" for PlayStation 2, Xbox and GameCube. Larry Goldberg, executive vice president of Activision Worldwide Studios, stated:

Activision said the game combined the gameplay of beat 'em ups, third-person shooters, and vehicular combat games, and includes over twenty branching missions and multiple endings, with the game recreating  of Los Angeles. The game was first shown at the 2002 E3 event in May.

To recreate the city, the developers used commercial satellite imaging, GPS technology and traditional photographs, with the in-game city stretching from the Hollywood Hills to Downtown to Santa Monica to Marina Del Rey. They also revealed details of the branching plot, with many levels having two or three opening cutscenes, depending on what the player has done in previous levels. They stressed it would be rare for the player to find a "Game Over" screen; usually a failed mission will simply lead to a later level by way of a different path than had the player completed the mission successfully. They also announced the game would feature roughly one-hundred randomly occurring crimes that the player has the option of solving whilst driving around the city. The casting of Russell Wong as protagonist Nick Kang and Gary Oldman as the game's main villain was also announced. In April 2003, Activision revealed the casting of Christopher Walken, C. C. H. Pounder, James Hong, Mako, Ron Perlman and Keone Young. Several days later, Michelle Rodriguez and Michael Madsen were also added to the cast.

However, they also said that over one-hundred landmarks in L.A. were featured in the game, in their exact geographical locations, such as the Los Angeles Convention Center and the Staples Center. On October 22, they sent the final build of the game to gaming websites. Several days later they confirmed rumors that Snoop Dogg was an unlocakble character, with his own mission and car. They also signed an exclusive licensing deal with PUMA.

New York City

New York City was first announced on July 21, 2004, when Activision CEO Ron Doornink announced plans for "sequels to True Crime, Call of Duty, Spider-Man, Tony Hawk, Shrek, and Quake". However, nothing more was heard about the game for almost a year; until May 2005, when Activision revealed the game was so big, developers Luxoflux had drafted in staff from another Activision owned developer, Z-Axis. In May 18, Activision debuted a trailer, which featured protagonist Marcus Reed arresting some criminals. At the 2005 E3 event, Activision dedicated a large part of their booth to the upcoming game, but no footage was made available, nor was any plot information, or even a title, with the game going by True Crime 2005. All that was confirmed at was that the game would definitely be released on current generation systems.

The game's official website revealed it was set in New York City, with an image of the Manhattan skyline appearing as the site's wallpaper. In August 2005, IGN published an interview with former NYPD detective Bill Clark, who had previously served as executive producer and technical advisor of NYPD Blue, and was working as head technical advisor for New York City. Of his involvement with the game, Clarke stated:

In his efforts to help Activision make the best game they could, Clarke found a compromise had to be reached between reality and the nature of videogaming:

A work-in-progress build of the game was shown on September 7. Activision revealed several features new to the game, including a continuous day/night cycle, a more populated city than the Los Angeles of Streets of LA, a darker palette than the first game, more cars and vehicles, the ability to travel by taxi or subway, and the ability to enter buildings beyond those related to plot. The following week, the main cast was shown, including Laurence Fishburne, Mickey Rourke, Christopher Walken, Mariska Hargitay, Esai Morales, and Traci Lords. Marcus Reed was voiced by Avery Waddell. Details of the soundtrack were released a week later. The soundtrack's headliner was Redman, who was recording an original song for the game, and became an unlocakble character with his own minigame, much as Snoop Dogg had in Streets of LA.

As part of the video game's launch, PUMA revealed a unique sneaker mission within the game, and the production of a special edition sneaker. In the game, if players find all of the True Crime RS-100 sneakers throughout the city and return them to real New York City retailers featured in the game, the player unlocks an exclusive PUMA outfit for Reed. In addition, players could purchase the limited-edition True Crime RS-100 sneakers within the same New York City stores in the real world.

Initially, New York City was intended to have been the first part of a two-part series set in New York and featuring Marcus Reed, but the sequel was scrapped when the game proved a critical and commercial failure.

Hong Kong

Towards the end of 2007, Activision approached United Front Games to develop an open world game for next generation consoles set in Hong Kong, and unrelated to the True Crime series. Originally called Black Lotus, the game went into production in early 2008. A year into development, Activision proposed that Black Lotus be incorporated into the True Crime  franchise, hoping the new ideas brought to the table by United Front could help revitalize the franchise. At the 2009 Spike Video Game Awards, Activision debuted the game as True Crime: Hong Kong. Although originally slated for a Fall 2010 release, in May that year, Activision announced the game had been pushed back to early 2011 "in order to give the development team more time to deliver the high-quality entertainment experience they envision for the game".

In February 2011, however, Activision cancelled True Crime: Hong Kong, claiming that due to "quality issues", further investment would not make the game competitive in the open world genre. The game's executive producer Stephen Van Der Mescht expressed disappointment with Activision's decision, stating the game was "playable from start to finish and virtually complete in terms of content". Activision CEO Eric Hirshberg explained that an escalating budget and development delays were the main contributing factors in the game's cancellation. Hirshberg stated that the increase in budget and subsequent delays meant the game would have to be "a pretty incredible success in order to be worth the investment that it was taking to get it done". Due to competition posed by other titles, particularly Grand Theft Auto and Red Dead Redemption, and the fact that the previous game in the True Crime series had been a critical and commercial failure, Activision's view was that the game would not be able to compete. According to Hirshberg:

In August, Square Enix acquired the publishing rights to the game, although they did not buy the rights to the True Crime franchise, which were retained by Activision. Ultimately, the game was renamed Sleeping Dogs and released in August 2012. In December 2014, Activision abandoned the True Crime trademark completely.

Reception

The two games in the True Crime franchise garnered different reactions from critics. Both games received mixed reviews.

IGN's Aaron Boulding wrote of Streets of LA that "the greatest strength of this Luxoflux game is the integration of story and layers of game design into one cohesive package", calling it "an enjoyable game if you can clear your mind of Grand Theft Auto expectations". Game Informers Andrew Reiner wrote "True Crime is the first game to come along and truly give the Grand Theft Auto series a run for its money". However, he called Nick Kang "quite easily the most annoying new character in video games". GameSpy's Russ Fischer wrote "there's more to True Crime than GTA emulation". GameSpot's Jeff Gertsmann called Kang "completely unlikeable" and "an unnecessarily cocky jerk". Of the gameplay, he wrote "it makes decent attempts with its different styles of gameplay, but none of them are particularly well done". Eurogamer's Tom Bramwell was critical of the graphics, citing "low-resolution textures, some clipping issues, a rather horrible depth of field effect and a lack of screen-filling vistas". He also called Kang "one of the most unlikeable folks I've ever had the displeasure of thumbing around a third-person action game". Despite of the game's flaws, he concluded that "it's a respectable enough game in its own right".

IGN's Chris Roper was impressed with New York City, praising "how well your general duties as a cop are tied into the game, working very well alongside your own personal investigations" and finding the gameplay and game mechanics superior to Streets of LA. Eurogamer's Jim Rossignol was critical of the AI: "The perps you take down never suggest that they are anything other than mindless automata ready to be slain, and exhibit an artificiality that could never be described as 'intelligence'". GameSpy's Sterling McGarvey wrote: "Luxoflux have turned a slightly above-par GTA clone into a sub-par franchise". Of the graphics, he wrote that "the frame rate has a knack for chugging. Considering it's a console and not a five year-old PC running this game, it's unacceptable. Out of nowhere, the frame rate will completely bottom out while Marcus patrols the streets". He called the game "unfinished". GameSpot's Greg Mueller accused the game of being "so riddled with problems that it feels like it was rushed to make it to store shelves in time for the holidays. He cited "collision detection issues and edge detection problems that cause you to get stuck on the edge of a platform. [And] the game will actually freeze up entirely from time to time [...] There are also some pretty ugly clipping issues here too". He concluded "the technical problems far outweigh any faint hope this game ever had of being enjoyable. If you're curious about what a video game looks like before it goes through adequate testing and quality assurance, then by all means give this one a try".

Sales
Streets of LA was a commercial success. During its first two weeks on release in North America, it sold over 300,000 units across all platforms. By the end of its first month, it had sold over 600,000 units. Ultimately, the game went on to sell over 3 million units worldwide across all platforms.

New York City did not sell well, falling considerably short of Activision's expectations, and selling only 72,000 units in its first two weeks on release in North America.

References

Action-adventure games
Activision Blizzard franchises
Activision games
Detective video games
Luxoflux games
Open-world video games
Organized crime video games
Third-person shooters
Video game franchises
Video game franchises introduced in 2003
Video games about police officers
Video games with alternate endings
Video games developed in the United States